Shamsul Haque is a retired Bangladesh Army Lieutenant General who is the former QMG of Bangladesh Army.

Career 
Haque has also served as the Defence Advisor in Bangladesh Permanent Mission of United Nations Headquarters, New York. He also served as Commanding Officer of 6 Rifle Battalion in Bangladesh Rifles (Now Border Guard Bangladesh).

Haque was the previous chairman of Sena Kalyan Sangstha. He was made the chairman of Sena Kalyan Sangstha on 15 May 2014. Lt Gen Shams was commissioned in the 10th BMA Long Course in June 1984.  Under him construction of a new headquarters of the NSI in Segun Bagicha started in 2015.

Haque was the Director General of National Security Intelligence, the principal intelligence agency of Bangladesh until July 2018.

References

Living people
Bangladesh Army generals
Year of birth missing (living people)
Directors General of National Security Intelligence